Miguel Samacá (born 18 May 1946) is a Colombian former cyclist. He competed at the 1968, 1972 and the 1976 Summer Olympics. He won the Vuelta a Colombia in 1972 and 1974 as well as the Vuelta al Táchira in 1972.

References

External links
 

1946 births
Living people
Colombian male cyclists
Olympic cyclists of Colombia
Cyclists at the 1968 Summer Olympics
Cyclists at the 1972 Summer Olympics
Cyclists at the 1976 Summer Olympics
Sportspeople from Boyacá Department
20th-century Colombian people